In the 2013–14 season, Associazione Calcio Milan competed in Serie A for the 80th time, as well as the Coppa Italia and the UEFA Champions League. It was the club's 31st consecutive season in the top flight of Italian football.

By early 2014, it was clear that Milan were performing exceptionally poorly, prompting manager Massimiliano Allegri to be replaced by Clarence Seedorf in mid-January.

That same month, Milan was eliminated from the Coppa Italia in the quarter-finals (their second match of the tournament) by Udinese.

By February, Milan found themselves as low as 11th place in Serie A. They finished the season in 8th, failing to qualify to either the Champions League or Europa League for the following season for the first time in fifteen years.

In the Champions League, Milan secured a place in the group stage after defeating PSV Eindhoven in the play-off round 4–1 on aggregate. On 11 December 2013, Milan qualified for the knockout stage of the competition after playing to a 0–0 draw against Ajax, securing second place in the group behind leaders Barcelona. The Rossoneri were then matched in the round of 16 against Atlético Madrid, who defeated Milan 1–0 at the San Siro and 4–1 in Madrid, advancing 5–1 on aggregate. This continued Milan's run of never eliminating a Spanish club in the knockout phase of the competition since its refurbishment in 1992.

Players

First team squad

UEFA Champions League squad

A List

B List

Pre-season and friendlies

The Rossoneri resume training on 8 July 2013. They will play their first set of friendlies in Reggio Emilia in Città del Tricolore on 23 July to contest the TIM Trophy consisting of three games. Each game is 45 minutes each and this year, will be played against newly promoted Sassuolo and Serie A Champions Juventus. On Saturday, 27 July 2013, Milan will play Spanish side Valencia at the Mestalla in Valencia as part of the Guinness International Champions Cup. They will then travel in Munich to take part in the Audi Cup, to be played on 31 July and 1 August 2013 at Allianz Arena against two of
Bayern Munich, Manchester City and São Paulo. After this, they will fly to New York to play the final stages of the Guinness International Champions Cup between 4 and 7 August 2013 at MetLife Stadium. Milan will conclude their pre-season with the UEFA Champions League Play-off round, with their opponents due to be drawn on 9 August 2013 with the games being played between 20 and 28 August 2013.

Friendly

Competitions

Serie A

The season will start on 24 August 2013 and conclude on 18 May 2014.

League table

Results summary

Results by round

Matches

Coppa Italia

Milan entered the 2013–14 Coppa Italia in January, in the round of 16. First opponent was Serie B team Spezia that was defeated easily. In the next round, Milan was surprisingly eliminated by Udinese.

UEFA Champions League

Milan started their 2013–14 UEFA Champions League campaign in the play-off round against Dutch runners-up PSV, winning over two legs to qualify for the group stage. For the fourth time in the last three Champions League tournaments, Milan were matched-up against Barcelona. Milan qualified as group runners-up, behind the Catalans. Milan were then drawn against Atlético Madrid in the round of 16, who defeated them over both legs.

Play-off round

Group stage

Knockout phase

Round of 16

Statistics

Appearances and goals

|-
! colspan="14" style="background:#dcdcdc; text-align:center"| Goalkeepers

|-
! colspan="14" style="background:#dcdcdc; text-align:center"| Defenders

|-
! colspan="14" style="background:#dcdcdc; text-align:center"| Midfielders

|-
! colspan="14" style="background:#dcdcdc; text-align:center"| Forwards

|-
! colspan="14" style="background:#dcdcdc; text-align:center"| Other

|-
! colspan="14" style="background:#dcdcdc; text-align:center"| Players transferred out during the season

Discipline

Transfers (Summer window)
In the summer transfer window, Milan sought to continue their campaign of signing younger players. Riccardo Saponara came to the club, returning from his six-month loan to Empoli. Jherson Vergara also arrived, having signed on before the transfer market, just after fellow Colombian defender Cristián Zapata was bought by Milan after a successful loan spell. Another import transfer was midfielder Andrea Poli, purchased from Sampdoria.The main hits come in the final part of summer market, acquiring Alessandro Matri and welcoming back Brazilian star Kaká. Milan parted ways with club legend Massimo Ambrosini, who was released on 30 June 2013 after he was not offered a contract extension. Other departures included Bojan (who returned to his main club Barcelona), Mathieu Flamini (who did not agree to a contract extension), Luca Antonini and, arguably most importantly, Kevin-Prince Boateng, who left just the day after scoring two goals in the 2013–14 UEFA Champions League play-off against PSV, assuring the team's progression to the tournament's group stage.

In

Out

Out on loan

Transfers (Winter window)
Milan 2013–14 winter transfer window began very early as, on 12 October 2013, Adil Rami signed an agreement with Milan to join on a six-month loan at the start of the winter transfer season. It was also confirmed, on 28 October, that Keisuke Honda would join them during the 2014 winter transfer season. Also arriving in the window were African star Michael Essien and Adel Taarabt. Departures from the team included the loan-outs of M'Baye Niang, Antonio Nocerino and Alessandro Matri

In

Out

Out on loan

See also
List of A.C. Milan seasons

References

2013-14
Milan
Milan